Fallen is a 1998 American supernatural thriller film directed by Gregory Hoblit, produced by Charles Roven and Dawn Steel, from a screenplay by Nicholas Kazan. Denzel Washington plays a Philadelphia police detective who is investigating occult murders committed by an apparent copycat killer. John Goodman, Donald Sutherland, Embeth Davidtz, James Gandolfini and Elias Koteas also star.  Warner Bros. released Fallen on January 16, 1998. Despite the movie’s underperformance at the box-office, Fallen gained a cult following and is considered one of Washington’s most underrated films.

Plot 
Philadelphia Police Detective John Hobbes visits serial killer Edgar Reese, whom he helped capture, on death row.  Reese is in high spirits and, during conversation, grabs Hobbes' hand and delivers a spiteful monologue in an unknown language, assumed to be gibberish but later identified as Aramaic. As he is executed, Reese mocks the spectators and sings "Time Is on My Side" by the Rolling Stones.

Hobbes and his partner Jonesy investigate a string of new murders reminiscent of Reese's style, which they assume is by a copycat killer. Following hints given by Reese and the copycat killer, Hobbes tracks down a woman named Gretta Milano. Gretta explains that her father, a former detective, killed himself in an isolated cabin after being accused of a series of occult murders similar to the ones Hobbes and Jonesy are investigating. Hobbes visits the Milano family's abandoned lake-house. In the basement he finds several unsettling books about demonic possession. He also discovers the name "Azazel" written on a wall, obscured under layers of paint and grime.

Hobbes asks Gretta about the name, but she strongly urges him to drop the case to protect the lives of himself and his loved ones. She reconsiders after a terrifying encounter with Azazel, who confronts her in the guise of several strangers on the street and attempts to possess her. Seeking sanctuary in a church, Gretta explains to Hobbes that Azazel is a fallen angel who can possess human beings by touch. Hobbes realizes that Azazel, while possessing Edgar Reese, shook his hand before the execution but was not able to possess him. Gretta explains that the demon will try to ruin his life and warns him of Azazel's inevitable victory. Azazel visits Hobbes at his precinct, possesses his friend Lou, and taunts him. Azazel moves from person to person, singing "Time Is on My Side" after each transfer. Hobbes asks Lou and several others why they were singing the song, but they have no recollection. Hobbes runs outside and calls out to Azazel in Aramaic. The demon, now moving among people in the street, praises Hobbes for his cleverness. Hobbes says that he knows of Azazel's true identity; the demon threatens him and disappears.

To provoke Hobbes, Azazel possesses his nephew Sam and attacks John's intellectually disabled brother Art in their home. He again flees into other people on the street, ending up in a schoolteacher. As the teacher, Azazel draws a gun and forces Hobbes to shoot his host in front of a group of bystanders. Azazel boasts that if his current host is killed, he can transfer to another host in the surrounding area without needing to touch them.

Lieutenant Stanton informs Hobbes that his fingerprints were found at one of the murder scenes, and in light of the bizarre circumstances of the shooting of the teacher, he has become a suspect for all the murders. Azazel inhabits several of the witnesses and gives false accounts that the shooting was unprovoked, throwing further suspicion on Hobbes. Azazel comes into Hobbes' home and murders his brother, while marking Sam. Hobbes takes his nephew to Gretta's house. Gretta explains that, if forced out of a host body, Azazel can only travel for as long as one breath can sustain him, after which he will die.

Hobbes goes to the Milano cabin and calls Jonesy, knowing he will trace the call. Stanton and Jonesy arrive to arrest Hobbes; however, Jonesy kills Stanton, revealing himself to be possessed. Azazel prepares to shoot himself, which will allow him to possess Hobbes, the only other person for miles around. Hobbes wrestles Jonesy for his gun, and Jonesy is fatally wounded. Hobbes smokes cigarettes which he explains have been laced with the same poison Azazel used to kill his brother, which will leave Azazel stranded in the wilderness without a host. Hobbes taunts him and kills Jonesy. Azazel possesses Hobbes, frantically attempts to flee, and succumbs to the poison. Azazel, in voice over, mocks the audience for believing that he has lost, and a possessed cat emerges from beneath the cabin and heads back to civilization.

Cast 
 Denzel Washington as Detective John Hobbes
 John Goodman as Detective "Jonesy" Jones
 Donald Sutherland as Lieutenant Stanton
 Embeth Davidtz as Gretta Milano
 James Gandolfini as Detective Lou
 Elias Koteas as Edgar Reese
 Gabriel Casseus as Art Hobbes
 Michael J. Pagan as Sam Hobbes
 Robert Joy as Mickey Noons / Charles Olom
 Aida Turturro as Detective Tiffany
 Renee Spie as Azazel (voice)
 Cress Williams as Detective Joe

Release 
Fallen was released in 2,448 cinemas on 16 January 1998. It landed at #3 at the box office and made $10.4 million in its opening weekend. In its second weekend, it made $4.9 million. After being in cinemas for four weeks, the film made $23.3 million in the US and $981,200 internationally for a total of $25.2 million.

Reception 
On Rotten Tomatoes Fallen has an approval rating of 40% based on reviews from 57 critics. The site's consensus reads: "Has an interesting premise. Unfortunately it's just a recycling of old materials, and not all that thrilling." 
Janet Maslin of The New York Times called it "A stylish if seriously far-fetched nightmare," but Variety wrote that "Washington has the almost impossible task of holding together a convoluted picture that's only intermittently suspenseful and not very engaging emotionally or intellectually." Roger Ebert gave the film a mixed review, writing "the idea is better than the execution, and by the end, the surprises become too mechanical and inevitable.” The Chicago Reader praised Washington's performance, but referring to the film's continual use of The Rolling Stones song "Time Is on My Side", wrote "The first half of this movie holds some promise, but time is not on its side."

Ryan Parker from Hollywood Reporter said: “Although it was not a box office success, the film ... has gone on to become a beloved cult classic.“

References

External links 
 
 
 
 

1998 films
1998 crime thriller films
1998 horror films
1990s English-language films
1990s serial killer films
1990s supernatural thriller films
American crime thriller films
American police detective films
American serial killer films
American supernatural thriller films
Atlas Entertainment films
Demons in film
Fiction with unreliable narrators
Fictional portrayals of the Philadelphia Police Department
Films about spirit possession
Films directed by Gregory Hoblit
Films produced by Dawn Steel
Films produced by Charles Roven
Films scored by Tan Dun
Films set in Philadelphia
Films shot in Los Angeles
Films shot in New Jersey
Films shot in Philadelphia
Religious horror films
Warner Bros. films
1990s American films